Ram Nath Thakur, (born 3 March 1950 in Karpoori Gram, Samastipur district, Bihar) a politician from Janata Dal (United) party, is a Member of the Parliament of India representing Bihar in the Rajya Sabha, the upper house of the Parliament. He is Leader of Janata Dal (United) in Rajya Sabha .

He was a member of Bihar Legislative Council and became Minister of Sugarcane Industries in Lalu Prasad's first cabinet. From November 2005 to November 2010 was Minister of Revenue and Land Reforms, Law, Information and Public Relations in Second Nitish Kumar ministry.

He was elected in for the term April 2014-April-2020.

References

Janata Dal (United) politicians
1950 births
Living people
Rajya Sabha members from Bihar
People from Samastipur district
Members of the Bihar Legislative Council
Members of the Bihar Legislative Assembly